Helenium pinnatifidum is a North American perennial plant in the sunflower family, commonly known as southeastern sneezeweed. It is found in the southeaster United States (Alabama, Georgia, Florida, and the Carolinas).

Leaves are pinnatifid, meaning deeply divided into many small parts. There are also 13-34 yellow ray flowers, each with three prominent lobes at the tip.

References

External links
Southeastern Flora
Native Florida Wildflowers
Alabama Plant Atlas

Flora of the Southeastern United States
Plants described in 1841
pinnatifidum
Flora without expected TNC conservation status